The 57th Legislature of National Congress is the current meeting of the legislative branch of the Federal Government of Brazil, composed by the Federal Senate and the Chamber of Deputies. It convened in Brasília on 1 February 2023, a month after the inauguration of the winner of the 2022 presidential election.

In the 2022 elections, the Liberal Party became the largest party in the Chamber with 99 deputies and in the Senate with 13 senators.

Major events
 1 February 2023: Congress convened. Members-elect of the Federal Senate and the Chamber of Deputies are sworn in. Election for the Directors' Board of the Chamber of Deputies and Senate. Senator Rodrigo Pacheco (PSD-MG) was re-elected Senate President and Congressman Arthur Lira (PP-AL) was re-elected Chamber President.
 2 February 2023: Joint session of the National Congress to officially inaugurate the 57th Legislature.

Party summary

Chamber of Deputies

Federal Senate

Leadership

Federal Senate

 President of the Federal Senate: Rodrigo Pacheco (PSD–MG)

 Government Leader: Jaques Wagner (PT-BA)
 Majority Leader: Renan Calheiros (MDB-AL)
 Opposition Leader: Rogério Marinho (PL-RN)
 Minority Leader: Ciro Nogueira (PP-PI)
 Female Caucus Leader: TBD
 PSD Leader: Otto Alencar (BA)
 PL Leader: Flávio Bolsonaro (RJ)
 MDB Leader: Eduardo Braga (AM)
 UNIÃO Leader: Efraim Filho (PB)
 PT Leader: Fabiano Contarato (ES)
 PP Leader: Tereza Cristina (MS)
 PODE Leader: Oriovisto Guimarães (PR)
 PSB Leader: Jorge Kajuru (GO)
 Republicanos Leader: Mecias de Jesus (RR)
 PSDB Leader: Izalci Lucas (DF)
 PDT Leader: Cid Gomes (CE)
 REDE Leader: Randolfe Rodrigues (AP)

Chamber of Deputies

 President of the Chamber of Deputies: Arthur Lira (PP-AL)

 Government Leader: José Guimarães (PT-CE)
 Majority Leader: TBD
 Opposition Leader: Carlos Jordy (PL-RJ)
 Minority Leader: Eduardo Bolsonaro (PL-SP)
 PL Leader: Altineu Côrtes (RJ)
 Brazil of Hope Leader: Zeca Dirceu (PR)
 UNIÃO Leader: Elmar Nascimento (BA)
 PP Leader: André Fufuca (MA)
 MDB Leader: Isnaldo Bulhões Junior (AL)
 PSD Leader: Antonio Brito (BA)
 Republicanos Leader: Hugo Motta (PB)
 Always Forward Leader: Adolfo Viana (BA)
 PDT Leader: André Figueiredo (CE)
 PSB Leader: Felipe Carreras (PE)
 PSOL REDE Leader: Guilherme Boulos (SP)
 PODE Leader: Fábio Macedo (MA)
 Avante Leader: Luis Tibé (MG)
 PSC Leader: TBD
 Patriota Leader: Fred Costa (MG)
 PROS Leader: TBD
 Solidariedade Leader: Aureo Ribeiro (RJ)
 NOVO Leader: Adriana Ventura (SP)

Members

Federal Senate

Acre
  Alan Rick (UNIÃO)
  Márcio Bittar (UNIÃO)
  Sérgio Petecão (PSD)

Alagoas
  Fernando Farias (MDB)
  Renan Calheiros (MDB)
  Rodrigo Cunha (UNIÃO)

Amapá
  Davi Alcolumbre (UNIÃO)
  Lucas Barreto (PSD)
  Randolfe Rodrigues (REDE)

Amazonas
  Eduardo Braga (MDB)
  Omar Aziz (PSD)
  Plínio Valério (PSDB)

Bahia
  Angelo Coronel (PSD)
  Jaques Wagner (PT)
  Otto Alencar (PSD)

Ceará
  Augusta Brito (PT)
  Cid Gomes (PDT)
  Eduardo Girão (PODE)

Espírito Santo
  Fabiano Contarato (PT)
  Magno Malta (PL)
  Marcos do Val (PODE)

Federal District
  Damares Alves (Republicanos)
  Izalci Lucas (PSDB)
  Leila Barros (PDT)

Goiás
  Jorge Kajuru (PSB)
  Vanderlan Cardoso (PSD)
  Wilder Morais (PL)

Maranhão
  Ana Paula Brandão (PSB)
  Eliziane Gama (PSD)
  Weverton Rocha (PDT)

Mato Grosso
  Jayme Campos (UNIÃO)
  Margareth Buzetti (PP)
  Wellington Fagundes (PL)

Mato Grosso do Sul
  Nelson Trad (PSD)
  Soraya Thronicke (UNIÃO)
  Tereza Cristina (PP)

Minas Gerais
  Carlos Viana (PODE)
  Cleiton Gontijo (Republicanos)
  Rodrigo Pacheco (PSD)

Pará
  Beto Faro (PT)
  Jader Barbalho (MDB)
  Zequinha Marinho (PL)

Paraíba
  Daniella Ribeiro (PSD)
  Efraim Filho (UNIÃO)
  Veneziano Vital do Rêgo (MDB)

Paraná
  Flávio Arns (PSB)
  Oriovisto Guimarães (PODE)
  Sérgio Moro (UNIÃO)

Pernambuco
  Humberto Costa (PT)
  Jarbas Vasconcelos (MDB)
  Teresa Leitão (PT)

Piauí
  Ciro Nogueira (PP)
  Jussara Lima (PT)
  Marcelo Castro (MDB)

Rio de Janeiro
  Carlos Portinho (PL)
  Flávio Bolsonaro (PL)
  Romário Faria (PL)

Rio Grande do Norte
  Rogério Marinho (PL)
  Styvenson Valentim (PODE)
  Zenaide Maia (PSD)

Rio Grande do Sul
  Hamilton Mourão (Republicanos)
  Luis Carlos Heinze (PP)
  Paulo Paim (PT)

Rondônia
  Confúcio Moura (MDB)
  Jaime Bagattoli (PL)
  Marcos Rogério (PL)

Roraima
  Chico Rodrigues (PSB)
  Hiran Gonçalves (PP)
  Mecias de Jesus (Republicanos)

Santa Catarina
  Esperidião Amin (PP)
  Ivete da Silveira (MDB)
  Jorge Seif (PL)

São Paulo
  Alexandre Giordano (MDB)
  Mara Gabrilli (PSD)
  Marcos Pontes (PL)

Sergipe
  Alessandro Vieira (PSDB)
  Laercio Oliveira (PP)
  Rogério Carvalho (PT)

Tocantins
  Dorinha Rezende (UNIÃO)
  Eduardo Gomes (PL)
  Irajá Abreu (PSD)

Chamber of Deputies

Acre
  Antônia Lucia (Republicanos)
  Eduardo Velloso (UNIÃO)
  Gerlen Diniz (PP)
  Meire Serafim (UNIÃO)
  Socorro Neri (PP)
  Roberto Duarte (Republicanos)
  Ulysses Araújo (UNIÃO)
  Zezinho Barbary (PP)

Alagoas
  Alfredo Gaspar (UNIÃO)
  Arthur Lira (PP)
  Daniel Barbosa (PP)
  Fabio Costa (PP)
  Isnaldo Bulhões Jr (MDB)
  Luciano Amaral (PV)
  Marx Beltrão (PP)
  Paulo dos Santos (PT)
  Rafael Brito (MDB)

Amapá
  Acácio Favacho (MDB)
  Augusto Pupio (MDB)
  Dorinaldo Malafaia (PDT)
  Goreth de Sousa (PDT)
  Josenildo Abrantes (PDT)
  Silvia Waiãpi (PL)
  Sonize Barbosa (PL)
  Vinicius Gurgel (PL)

Amazonas
  Adail Filho (Republicanos)
  Alberto Neto (PL)
  Armom Mandel (Cidadania)
  Atila Lins (PSD)
  Fausto Santos Jr. (UNIÃO)
  Saullo Vianna (UNIÃO)
  Sidney Leite (PSD)
  Silas Câmara (Republicanos)

Bahia
  Adalberto Barreto (UNIÃO)
  Adolfo Viana (PSDB)
  Alden Lázaro (PL)
  Alex Santana (Republicanos)
  Alice Portugal (PCdoB)
  Antonio Brito (PSD)
  Arthur Maia (UNIÃO)
  Bacelar Batista (PV)
  Charles Fernandes (PSD)
  Claudio Cajado (PP)
  Daniel Almeida (PCdoB)
  Diego Coronel (PSD)
  Elmar Nascimento (UNIÃO)
  Felix Mendonça (PDT)
  Gabriel Nunes (PSD)
  Isidório de Santana Jr (Avante)
  Ivoneide Caetano (PT)
  João Carlos Bacelar (PL)
  João Leão (PP)
  Jorge Solla (PT)
  José Neto (PT)
  José Rocha (UNIÃO)
  Joseildo Ramos (PT)
  Josias Gomes (PT)
  Leonardo Prates (PDT)
  Leur Lomanto Jr (UNIÃO)
  Lídice da Mata (PSB)
  Marcio Marinho (Republicanos)
  Mário Negromonte Jr (PP)
  Neto Carletto (PP)
  Otto Alencar Filho (PSD)
  Paulo Azi (UNIÃO)
  Paulo Magalhães (PSD)
  Raimundo Costa (PODE)
  Ricardo Maia (MDB)
  Roberta Roma (PL)
  Rogeria Santos (Republicanos)
  Valmir Assunção (PT)
  Waldenor Pereira (PT)

Ceará
  André Fernandes (PL)
  André Figueiredo (PDT)
  Antônio José Albuquerque (PP)
  Célio Studart (PSD)
  Danilo Forte (UNIÃO)
  Dayany Bittencourt (UNIÃO)
  Domingos Neto (PSD)
  Eduardo Bismarck (PDT)
  Eunicio Oliveira (MDB)
  Fernanda Pessoa (UNIÃO)
  Idilvan Alencar (PDT)
  Jaziel Pereira (PL)
  José Airton (PT)
  José Guimarães (PT)
  Júnior Mano (PL)
  Luiz Gastão (PSD)
  Luizianne Lins (PT)
  Matheus Noronha (PL)
  Mauro Benevides Filho (PDT)
  Moses Rodrigues (UNIÃO)
  Robério Monteiro (PDT)
  Yury Bruno (PL)

Espírito Santo
  Amaro Neto (Republicanos)
  Evair Vieira de Melo (PP)
  Gilson Daniel (PODE)
  Gilvan Aguiar (PL)
  Helder Salomão (PT)
  Jack Rocha (PT)
  Josias da Vitória (PP)
  Messias Donato (Republicanos)
  Paulo Foletto (PSB)
  Victor Linhalis (PODE)

Federal District
  Alberto Fraga (PL)
  Bia Kicis (PL)
  Erika Kokay (PT)
  Fred Linhares (Republicanos)
  Gilvan Maximo (Republicanos)
  Julio Cesar Ribeiro (Republicanos)
  Rafael Prudente (MDB)
  Reginaldo Veras (PV)

Goiás
  Adriana Accorsi (PT)
  Adriano Avelar (PP)
  Alcides Ribeiro (PL)
  Célio Silveira (MDB)
  Daniel Ramos (PL)
  Flavia Morais (PDT)
  Glauskston Batista (PSC)
  Gustavo Gayer (PL)
  Ismael Alexandrino (PSD)
  Jeferson Rodrigues (Republicanos)
  José Nelto (PP)
  Lêda Borges (PSDB)
  Magda Mofatto (PL)
  Marussa Boldrin (MDB)
  Rubens Otoni
  Silvye Alves (UNIÃO)
  Zacharias Calil (UNIÃO)

Maranhão
  Aluisio Mendes (PSC)
  Amanda Gentil (PP)
  André Fufuca (PP)
  Benjamin Maranhão (UNIÃO)
  Cleber Verde (Republicanos)
  Fábio Macedo (PODE)
  Gildenemir de Lima (PL)
  Hildelis Duarte Jr (PSB)
  Josimar Rodrigues (PL)
  Josivaldo Melo (PSD)
  Junior Lourenço (PL)
  Maria Deusdete Cunha (PL)
  Marcio Jerry (PCdoB)
  Márcio Honaiser (PDT)
  Marreca Filho (Patriota)
  Pedro Lucas Fernandes (UNIÃO)
  Roseana Sarney (MDB)
  Rubens Pereira Jr (PT)

Mato Grosso
  Abílio Brunini (PL)
  Amália Barros (PL)
  Emanuel Pinheiro Neto (MDB)
  Fábio Garcia (UNIÃO)
  Jonildo Assis (UNIÃO)
  José Medeiros (PL)
  Juarez Costa (MDB)
  Rubia Fernanda (PL)

Mato Grosso do Sul
  Beto Pereira (PSDB)
  Camila Jara (PT)
  Dagoberto Nogueira (PSDB)
  Geraldo Resende (PSDB)
  Luiz Ovando (PP)
  Marcos Pollon (PL)
  Rodolfo Nogueira (PL)
  Vander Loubet (PT)

Minas Gerais
  Aécio Neves (PSDB)
  Ana Paula Leão (PP)
  Ana Pimentel (PT)
  André Janones (Avante)
  Antônio Pinheiro Neto (PP)
  Bruno Farias (Avante)
  Célia Xakriabá (PSOL)
  Dandara Tonantzin (PT)
  Diego Andrade (PSD)
  Dimas Fabiano (PP)
  Domingos Sávio (PL)
  Duda Salabert (PDT)
  Emidio Madeira Jr (PL)
  Eros Biondini (PL)
  Euclydes Pettersen (Republicanos)
  Fred Costa (Patriota)
  Frederico Escalera (Patriota)
  Gilberto Abramo (Republicanos)
  Greyce Elias (Avante)
  Hercilio Coelho Diniz (MDB)
  Igor Timo (PODE)
  Ione Barbosa (Avante)
  João Carlos Siqueira (PT)
  José Silva Soares (Solidariedade)
  José Vitor Aguiar (PL)
  Junio Amaral (PL)
  Lafayette Andrada (Republicanos)
  Leonardo Monteiro (PT)
  Lincoln Portela (PL)
  Luis Tibé (Avante)
  Luiz Fernando Faria (PSD)
  Marcelo Álvaro Antônio (PL)
  Marcelo Freitas (UNIÃO)
  Mário Heringer (PDT)
  Maurício Souza (PL)
  Miguel Ângelo (PT)
  Misael Varella (PSD)
  Nely Aquino (PODE)
  Newton Cardoso Jr (MDB)
  Nikolas Ferreira (PL)
  Odair Cunha (PT)
  Patrus Ananias (PT)
  Paulo Abi-Ackel (PSDB)
  Paulo Guedes (PT)
  Pedro Aihara (Patriota)
  Rafael Simões (UNIÃO)
  Reginaldo Lopes (PT)
  Rodrigo de Castro (UNIÃO)
  Rogério Correia (PT)
  Rosângela Reis (PL)
  Samuel Viana (PL)
  Stefano Aguiar (PSD)
  Weliton Prado (PROS)

Pará
  Andreia Siqueira (MDB)
  Alessandra Haber (MDB)
  Celso Sabino (UNIÃO)
  Dilvanda Faro (PT)
  Éder Mauro (PL)
  Elcione Barbalho (MDB)
  Joaquim Passarinho (PL)
  José Priante (MDB)
  Júnior Ferrari (PSD)
  Keniston Braga (MDB)
  Lenildo Mendes (PL)
  Olival Marques (MDB)
  Raimundo Santos (PSD)
  Renilce Nicodemos (MDB)

Paraíba
  Aguinaldo Ribeiro (PP)
  Damião Feliciano (UNIÃO)
  Emerson de Lucena (PP)
  Gervasio Maia (PSB)
  Gilberto Silva (PL)
  Hugo Motta (Republicanos)
  Luiz Couto (PT)
  Murilo Galdino (Republicanos)
  Romero Rodrigues (PSC)
  Ruy Carneiro (PSC)
  Wellington Roberto (PL)
  Wilson Santiago (Republicanos)

Paraná
  Aliel Machado (PV)
  Beto Preto (PSD)
  Beto Richa (PSDB)
  Carol Dartora (PT)
  Deltan Dallagnol (PODE)
  Diego Garcia (Republicanos)
  Dilceu Sperafico (PP)
  Enio Verri (PT)
  Felipe Francischini (UNIÃO)
  Fernando Giacobo (PL)
  Filipe Barros (PL)
  Geraldo Mendes (UNIÃO)
  Gilson Fahur (PSD)
  Gleisi Hoffmann (PT)
  Leandre Dal Ponte (PSD)
  Luciano Ducci (PSB)
  Luisa Canziani (PSD)
  Luiz Nishimori (PSD)
  Marco Aurelio Ribeiro (PP)
  Matheus Laiola (UNIÃO)
  Nelsi Conguetto (PL)
  Nelson Padovani (UNIÃO)
  Paulo Litro (PSD)
  Pedro Lupion (PP)
  Sandro Alex (PSD)
  Sérgio Souza (MDB)
  Tadeu Veneri (PT)
  Tião Medeiros (PP)
  Toninho Wandscheer (PP)
  Zeca Dirceu (PT)

Pernambuco
  André Ferreira (PL)
  Augusto Coutinho (Republicanos)
  Carlos Veras (PT)
  Clarissa Tércio (PP)
  Clodoaldo Magalhães (PV)
  Eduardo da Fonte (PP)
  Eriberto Medeiros (PSB)
  Eurico da Silva (PL)
  Felipe Carreras (PSB)
  Fernando Coelho Filho (UNIÃO)
  Fernando Monteiro (PP)
  Fernando Rodolfo (PL)
  Guilherme Uchoa (PSB)
  Iza Arruda (MDB)
  Lucas Ramos (PSB)
  Luciano Bivar (UNIÃO)
  Luiz Meira (PL)
  Lula da Fonte (PP)
  Maria Arraes (Solidariedade)
  Mendonça Filho (UNIÃO)
  Pedro Campos (PSB)
  Renildo Calheiros (PCdoB)
  Silvio Costa Filho (Republicanos)
  Túlio Gadêlha (REDE)
  Waldemar Oliveira (Avante)

Piauí
  Átila Lira (PP)
  Castro Neto (PSD)
  Flavio Nogueira (PT)
  Florentino Neto (PT)
  Francisco Costa (PT)
  Jadyel Alencar (PV)
  Julio Arcoverde (PP)
  Julio César (PSD)
  Marcos Aurélio Sampaio (PSD)
  Merlong Solano (PT)

Rio de Janeiro
  Alexandre Ramagem (PL)
  Altineu Côrtes (PL)
  Aureo Ribeiro (Solidariedade)
  Bandeira de Mello (PSB)
  Benedita da Silva (PT)
  Carlos Jordy (PL)
  Carlos Roberto Rodrigues (PP)
  Chico Alencar (PSOL)
  Chiquinho Brazão (UNIÃO)
  Chris Tonietto (PL)
  Daniel Soranz (PSD)
  Danielle Cunha (UNIÃO)
  Dimas Gadelha (PT)
  Eduardo Pazuello (PL)
  Glauber Braga (PSOL)
  Gutemberg Reis (MDB)
  Hélio Lopes (PL)
  Henrique Vieira (PSOL)
  Hugo Leal (PSD)
  Jandira Feghali (PCdoB)
  Jorge Braz (Republicanos)
  José Portugal Neto (PODE)
  Julio Lopes (PP)
  Laura Carneiro (PSD)
  Lindbergh Farias (PT)
  Luciano Vieira (PL)
  Luis Carlos Gomes (Republicanos)
  Luiz Lima (PL)
  Luiz Teixeira Jr (PP)
  Marcelo Crivella (Republicanos)
  Marcelo Queiroz (PP)
  Marcos Soares (UNIÃO)
  Marcos Tavares (PDT)
  Max Lemos (PROS)
  Murillo Gouvea (UNIÃO)
  Otoni de Paula (MDB)
  Pedro Paulo (PSD)
  Reimont Otoni (PT)
  Ricardo Abrão (UNIÃO)
  Roberto Monteiro (PL)
  Rogério Teixeira Jr (UNIÃO)
  Soraya Santos (PL)
  Sóstenes Cavalcante (PL)
  Talíria Petrone (PSOL)
  Tarcísio Motta (PSOL)
  Washington Siqueira (PT)

Rio Grande do Norte
  Benes Leocádio (UNIÃO)
  Eliéser Girão (PL)
  Evandro Gonçalves (PL)
  Fernando Vargas (PT)
  João Maia (PL)
  Natália Bonavides (PT)
  Paulo da Costa Freire (UNIÃO)
  Robinson Faria (PL)

Rio Grande do Sul
  Afonso Hamm (PP)
  Afonso Motta (PDT)
  Alceu Moreira (MDB)
  Alexandre Lindenmeyer (PT)
  Any Ortiz (Cidadania)
  Bibo Nunes (PL)
  Bohn Gass (PT)
  Carlos Gomes (Republicanos)
  Covatti Filho (PP)
  Daiana Santos (PCdoB)
  Daniel Trzeciak (PSDB)
  Danrlei de Deus Hinterholz (PSD)
  Denise Pessôa (PT)
  Dionilso Marcon (PT)
  Fernanda Melchionna (PSOL)
  Franciane Bayer (Republicanos)
  Giovani Cherini (PL)
  Heitor Schuch (PSB)
  Lucas Redecker (PSDB)
  Luciano Zucco (Republicanos)
  Luiz Carlos Busato (UNIÃO)
  Marcel Van Hattem (NOVO)
  Marcelo Moraes (PL)
  Márcio Biolchi (MDB)
  Maria do Rosário (PT)
  Marlon Santos (PL)
  Mauricio Marcon (PODE)
  Osmar Terra (MDB)
  Pedro Westphalen (PP)
  Pompeo de Mattos (PDT)
  Reginete Bispo (PT)
  Ubiratan Sanderson (PL)

Rondônia
  Chrisóstomo de Moura (PL)
  Cristiane Lopes (UNIÃO)
  Fernando Máximo (UNIÃO)
  Jose Clemente (UNIÃO)
  Lucio Mosquini (MDB)
  Maurício Carvalho (UNIÃO)
  Silvia Cristina (PL)
  Thiago Flores (MDB)

Roraima
  Antonio Albuquerque (Republicanos)
  Antonio Carlos Nicoletti (UNIÃO)
  Duda Ramos (MDB)
  Flavio Diniz (UNIÃO)
  Haroldo Cathedral (PSD)
  Helena Lima (MDB)
  Jhonatan de Jesus (Republicanos)
  Stélio Dener (Republicanos)

Santa Catarina
  Ana Paula Lima (PT)
  Carlos Chiodini (MDB)
  Caroline de Toni (PL)
  Daniel Freitas (PL)
  Daniela Reinehr (PL)
  Fabio Schiochet (UNIÃO)
  Geovania de Sá (PSDB)
  Gilson Marques (NOVO)
  Ismael dos Santos (PSD)
  Jorge Goetten (PL)
  Julia Zanatta (PL)
  Marcos Antônio Gomes (PL)
  Pedro Uczai (PT)
  Rafael Pezenti (MDB)
  Ricardo Guidi (PSD)
  Valdir Cobalchini (MDB)

São Paulo
  Adilson Barroso (PL)
  Adriana Ventura (NOVO)
  Alberto Mourão (MDB)
  Alencar Santana (PT)
  Alex Manente (Cidadania)
  Alexandre Leite (UNIÃO)
  Alfredo Cavalcante (PT)
  Antonio Carlos Rodrigues (PL)
  Arlindo Chinaglia (PT)
  Arnaldo Jardim (Cidadania)
  Augusto Rosa (PL)
  Baleia Rossi (MDB)
  Bruno Ganem (PODE)
  Carla Zambelli (PL)
  Carlos Alberto da Cunha (PP)
  Carlos Sampaio (PSDB)
  Carlos Zarattini (PT)
  Celso Russomanno (Republicanos)
  Cezar Freire (PSD)
  David Soares (UNIÃO)
  Eduardo Bolsonaro (PL)
  Erika Hilton (PSOL)
  Fabio Teruel (MDB)
  Fausto Pinato (PP)
  Felipe Becari (UNIÃO)
  Fernando Marangoni (UNIÃO)
  Gilberto Nascimento (PSC)
  Guilherme Boulos (PSOL)
  Ivan Valente (PSOL)
  Jefferson Campos (PL)
  Jilmar Tatto (PT)
  Jonas Donizette (PSB)
  Juliana Cardoso (PT)
  Kiko Celeguim (PT)
  Kim Kataguiri (UNIÃO)
  Luciene Cavalcante (PSOL)
  Luiz Carlos Motta (PL)
  Luiz Philippe of Orléans-Braganza (PL)
  Luiza Erundina (PSOL)
  Marcelo Lima (Solidariedade)
  Marcio Alvino (PL)
  Marco Bertaiolli (PSD)
  Marco Feliciano (PL)
  Marcos Palumbo (MDB)
  Marcos Pereira (Republicanos)
  Maria Rosas (Republicanos)
  Mario Frias (PL)
  Mauricio Neves (PP)
  Miguel Lombardi (PL)
  Milton Vieira (Republicanos)
  Nilto Tatto (PT)
  Orlando Silva (PCdoB)
  Paulo Alexandre Barbosa (PSDB)
  Paulo Bilynskyj (PL)
  Paulo Freire Costa (PL)
  Paulo Telhada (PP)
  Renata Abreu (PODE)
  Ricardo Salles (PL)
  Ricardo Silva (PSD)
  Rodrigo Gambale (PODE)
  Rosana Valle (PL)
  Rosângela Moro (UNIÃO)
  Rui Falcão (PT)
  Sâmia Bomfim (PSOL)
  Simone Marquetto (MDB)
  Tabata Amaral (PSB)
  Tiririca (PL)
  Vicente Paulo da Silva (PT)
  Vinicius Carvalho (Republicanos)
  Vitor Lippi (PSDB)

Sergipe
  Fabio Reis (PSD)
  Icaro de Valmir (PL)
  João Daniel (PT)
  Katarina Feitoza (PSD)
  Luiz Augusto Ribeiro (Republicanos)
  Rodrigo Valadares (UNIÃO)
  Thiago de Joaldo (PP)
  Yandra de André (UNIÃO)

Tocantins
  Alexandre Guimarães (Republicanos)
  Antonio Andrade (Republicanos)
  Carlos Henrique Gaguim (UNIÃO)
  Eli Borges (PL)
  Filipe Martins (PL)
  Lázaro Botelho (PP)
  Ricardo Ayres (Republicanos)
  Vicentinho Júnior (PP)

Committees

Federal Senate

Chamber of Deputies

Notes

References

Legislative branch of Brazil